Renu Sukheja (Hindi: , Bengali: ,; born 25 December 1959) is an Indian businesswoman, socialite and former model. She is the chief operating officer of Fashion and Media Consulting, Anthem Consulting Pvt. Ltd. With a career spanning more than two decades in the fashion industry, she is believed to be one of the most leading names in the world of fashion, media and showbiz in South India.

She has organised numerous grooming workshops for training girls for national and international beauty pageants selections, held across India and in Hyderabad. She has worked along with her husband, Raj Sukheja and renowned Indian Management Consultant Neeraj Gaba of I AM She – Miss Universe India fame in organizing various such grooming workshops for both men and women in various Indian cities. Hyderabad was the first city for this Pan India grooming wave. The event was managed by Anthem Entertainment, a division of Anthem Consulting Pvt. Ltd.

Personal life
Renu Sukheja was born on 25 December 1959 in Kolkata, West Bengal. She grew up in the Eastern Indian city of Kolkata, West Bengal and completed her schooling and education from the same city, Kolkata. She married Raj Sukheja and later shifted to the South Indian city, Hyderabad, Andhra Pradesh. She has two children, Rohit Sukheja and Reha Sukheja. Reha Sukheja is a  successful Indian model and the first runner up at I AM She – Miss Universe India 2010. Reha is the first model from Hyderabad to make it into the Lakme Fashion Week.

Professional life
Renu Sukheja is the chief operating officer of Fashion and Media Consulting, Anthem Consulting Pvt. Ltd. She has organized various Grooming workshops in many major Indian cities for both women and men and supported many Beauty Pageants, behind the Kalamandir Miss Hyderabad. She has also been a consultant for managing and setting up the Beauty Pageant scene in the Telugu movie Life Is Beautiful (2012 film) by Indian film director Sekhar Kammula.

Limca World Record

In the year 2010, at the age of 50, Renu Sukheja successfully attempted to set a world record for Elliptical Marathon. Renu Sukheja is now a World Record Holder Limca Book of Records for working out continually on the elliptical cross trainer (cardiovascular fitness equipment) for 15 hours at Helios Fitness Center, Hyderabad, Andhra Pradesh.

References

External links

Limca World Record for Elliptical Marathon
Renu Sukheja Interview You and I Magazine

Businesspeople from Hyderabad, India
1959 births
Living people
Indian women chief executives
Indian chief executives
Businesspeople from Kolkata
Female models from Kolkata
Indian chief operating officers
Businesswomen from West Bengal
20th-century Indian businesswomen
20th-century Indian businesspeople
21st-century Indian businesswomen
21st-century Indian businesspeople